The Berkshire Natural Resources Council (BNRC) is a non-profit land conservation and environmental advocacy organization formed in 1967 that protects and maintains more than 50 properties and  of conservation restrictions around the Berkshires in western Massachusetts. The mission of the BNRC is "to protect and preserve the natural beauty and ecological integrity of the Berkshires for public benefit and enjoyment."

BNRC has been active in preserving natural landscapes and resources on Mount Greylock, Yokun Ridge, and the South Taconic Range. It maintains hiking trails at its Steven's Glen preserve in West Stockbridge, Basin Pond in Lee, Olivia's Lookout in Lenox, and Bob's Way in Monterey, Massachusetts. It has also been active in advocating for environmental protection and remediation of the Housatonic River watershed.

References

Daniels, Tammy (December 09, 2008) "Williamstown Board Raises Concern Over Land Conservation" iBerkshires.com. Retrieved January 6, 2008.
Wangsness, Lisa (May 29, 2007)."Rangers flood State House instead of state parks" Boston Globe. Retrieved January 6, 2008.
Moran, Kevin (July 21, 2008). Conservation groups seek special label for Housatonic. Johnkerry.com. Retrieved January 6, 2008.
"Forest Legacy Feature Tract: Audubon / Piretti, Massachusetts June 1995" Forest Legacy Program: United States Forest Service. Retrieved January 6, 2008.
Aimes, Tad (August 25, 2008). Letter to the Massachusetts Secretary of Environmental Affairs. Berkshire Natural Resources Council. Retrieved January 6, 2008.

Berkshires
Environmental organizations based in Massachusetts
Nature conservation organizations based in the United States
Environmental organizations established in 1967
1967 establishments in Massachusetts